The 2017–18 Rider Broncs men's basketball team represented Rider University during the 2017–18 NCAA Division I men's basketball season. The Broncs, led by sixth-year head coach Kevin Baggett, played their home games at Alumni Gymnasium in Lawrenceville, New Jersey as members of the Metro Atlantic Athletic Conference. They finished the season 22–10, 15–3 in MAAC play to finish in a tie for the MAAC regular season championship with Canisius. After tie breakers, they were the No. 1 seed in the MAAC tournament where they were upset in the quarterfinals by Saint Peter's. As a regular season conference champion, and No. 1 seed in their conference tournament, who failed to win their conference tournament, they received an automatic bid to the National Invitation Tournament where they lost in the first round to Oregon.

Previous season 
The Broncs finished the 2016–17 season 18–15, 10–10 in MAAC play to finish in a tie for sixth place. They defeated Manhattan in the first round of the MAAC tournament before losing in the quarterfinals to Iona.

Roster

Schedule and results

|-
!colspan=9 style=| Exhibition

|-
!colspan=9 style=| Non-conference regular season

|-
!colspan=9 style=| MAAC regular season

|-
!colspan=9 style=| MAAC tournament

|-
!colspan=9 style=| NIT

References

Rider Broncs men's basketball seasons
Rider
Rider
Rider Broncs
Rider Broncs